Rebecca Nicole Johnson  is an Australian scientist (geneticist) and science communicator. Since April 2015, Johnson has been Director and Chief Scientist of the Australian Museum Research Institute (AMRI), Sydney, the first female to be appointed to the role since the establishment of the Australian Museum in 1827. She is also head of the Australian Museum's Australian Centre for Wildlife Genomics, a wildlife forensics laboratory based at the Australian Museum.

Johnson is Chief Investigator of the Koala Genome Consortium and co-leader of the Oz Mammals Genomics Framework Data Initiative.

Background and education 
Johnson was born in Minlaton, South Australia before moving to Sydney during primary school, she then attended Barrenjoey High School on Sydney's Northern Beaches. Johnson graduated from a Bachelor of Science (Hons) at the University of Sydney in 1996 and was then awarded her PhD in molecular evolutionary genetics through La Trobe University in 2000.

Research
Johnson has worked in animal molecular genetics in laboratories in Sydney, Townsville Queensland, Melbourne and Boston USA. She joined the Australian Museum in 2003 as laboratory manager, later became Head of Research before becoming head of the Australian Centre for Wildlife Genomics (a multifaceted management role as head of the Wildlife Genetics Laboratory, Frozen Tissue collection and overseeing the Microscopy & Microanalysis laboratory). She is now head of both the Australian Centre for Wildlife Genomics and three other units that comprise the Australian Museum's Scientific Infrastructure.

Johnson established and is Chief Investigator of The Koala Genome Consortium, in partnership with the University of NSW, the University of Sydney, the University of the Sunshine Coast. The complete koala genome was published in Nature Genetics in July 2018. The team is sequencing the genome and transcriptome of this iconic marsupial to assist in the conservation of this threatened species.

One of Johnson's most significant achievements to date has been to establish the Australian Museum as one of the global leaders in wildlife forensic science – a sub-discipline of forensic science that uses the Museum's unique collections, expertise and laboratory facilities in an innovative way. Johnson's team works across industry, law enforcement and academia as the Australian Centre for Wildlife Genomics is one of the few ISO 17025 accredited wildlife forensic science laboratories in the Australasian region. The team works with wildlife managers from zoos, the aviation industry or government who want to utilise DNA and genomics techniques in the management of their animals or for law enforcement purposes through DNA based wildlife forensic science.

Johnson has worked with sample types as diverse as shark fins, bird embryos, gall bladders, seized fish meat, salted animal skin, bones and horns. Some of these cases have resulted in prosecution and heavy penalties in court.

Johnson is a member of the Australian Academy of Forensic Sciences, and in 2014 Johnson became one of the few people in Australia to be appointed as a Wildlife Forensic Examiner by the Australian Federal Environment Minister under section 303GS(1) of Commonwealth Environment Protection and Biodiversity Protection Act 1999. She is also a certified wildlife forensic scientist under the certification program run by the international Society for Wildlife Forensic Science.

Johnson is president of the Australian New Zealand Forensic Science Society NSW Branch, currently the secretary of the Genetics Society of Australasia and is Director of Membership and Outreach of the International Society of Wildlife Forensic Science. She is a Fellow of the Royal Society of New South Wales (FRSN).

Johnson's career has been supported by her science mentors Marianne Frommer, John Sved and the late Professor Ross Crozier. She in turn is passionate about mentoring and is an energetic mentor to students and young researchers.

References

Living people
Australian geneticists
La Trobe University alumni
University of Sydney alumni
Australian women scientists
Year of birth missing (living people)
Place of birth missing (living people)
Women geneticists
21st-century Australian scientists
21st-century women scientists
Fellows of the Royal Society of New South Wales
Members of the Order of Australia